Glynis Jones is a composer, musician and member of the BBC Radiophonic Workshop. She joined the Workshop in 1973. In 1976, she produced the album Out of This World, on which some of her material appears. Her compositions also feature on the album The Radiophonic Workshop.
Currently living in West London

References
About the BBC Radiophonic Workshop
Wee have also sound-houses ... Robin Carmody, 7 May 2001

BBC Radiophonic Workshop
British electronic musicians
Living people
British women in electronic music
Year of birth missing (living people)